TUGS may refer to:
 Tugs (TV series) A British children's television series.
 tugboats